Phú Túc may refer to several places in Vietnam:

Phú Túc, Gia Lai, a township and capital of Krông Pa District
, a rural commune of Phú Xuyên District
, a rural commune of Châu Thành District
, a rural commune of Định Quán District